Panditha.M.Gopala Krishna Iyer (1878–1927) (பண்டித ம.கோபாலகிருஷ்ண ஐயர்), popularly known as Ma.Ko, served the cause of development of the Tamil language during the first quarter of the twentieth century. Ma.Ko. was a poet, translator, essayist, dramatist, editor of literary journals and above all a patriot.

A student of the renowned Tamil scholar, Cholavandan Arasan Shanmuganar, he served in the Tamil department of Madura College for over a decade and later became Head, Dept. of Tamil, National College, Trichy. He founded the Madurai Manavar Sendhamizh Sangam on 5 May 1901 to promote interest in Tamil language among students. A friend of Pandithurai Thevar, he also served as Member and Examiner in Madurai Tamil Sangam.

A close friend of Bharathiyar, he was the one who helped Bharati when he came from Ettayapuram to Madurai, first to join Sethupathi School and later to join Sudesamitran as sub-editor.

A devotee of Swami Vivekananda, Ma. Ko. had accompanied King Bhaskara Sethupathi to Pamban in 1897 to receive Swamiji.

When Gurudev Rabindranath Tagore visited Madurai, it was Ma.Ko. who presented a poem of felicitation to Rabindranath Tagore at a meeting of Tamil scholars in Madurai.

A versatile writer and eloquent speaker, a translator par excellence, he has received accolades from celebrities like Rev. G.U.Pope, Dr.U.V. Saminatha Iyer, Mahakavi Bharathi, V.O. Chidambaram Pillai, Pandithamani Kadiresa Chettiyar and Va.Su. Chengalvaraya Pillai.

Ma.Ko. was also secretary, Vivekananda Union, Madurai and Tamil professor at Native college, Madurai.

The oriental and the occidental seem to have found a happy fusion in Ma.Ko. For instance, his work Filial Duty (புதல்வர் கடமை) which was prescribed by the textbook committee in 1920s contains the stories of 40 personalities who have been exemplary in observing filial duty. They include characters from Valmiki Ramayana like Sri Rama and Bharatha, from Vyasa's Mahabharatha like Bhishma, Yudhishtira, Arjun and Nala, historical characters like Shankara, Pattinathaar, Pisiraandaiyar, ideal sons from Western culture like Alexander, Quintus Cicero, Casabianca, Samuel Johnson, Italian brothers Anabyas and Ambinomus, Spanish artist Murillo and his student Sebastian. He has drawn from a wide variety of sources and this can be attributed to his own scholarship and his erudite family. His passion and commitment to learn from all cultures is also evident in his work.

Early life 
Ma.Ko. was born in the village of Lalgudi, Trichinopalli district in 1878 in a highly pious, disciplined and close-knit family. His father, Mahadeva Iyer, worked as shirastedar at Madurai sub-court. His mother Pravartha Srimathi was a highly pious lady and an embodiment of patience, from whom young Gopalakrishnan and his siblings learnt all the stories from Indian epics and puranas. He had two elder brothers, Jagadeesan and Paramasivam, a younger brother, Duraiswamy and two younger sisters Chellameenakshi and Parvatham.

Ma.Ko. passed the FA examination and then learnt Tamil under the celebrated Tamil scholar, Cholavandan Arasan Shanmukanar. Ma.Ko's articles were published in various journals from 1896 when he was only eighteen years old.

In 1897, when he was 19, he had accompanied King of Ramnad, Baskara Sethupathy, to Pamban to receive Swami Vivekananda when Swami was returning to India after his heroic historic trip to the U.S. Ma.Ko was highly inspired by the magnetic personality of Swami. In July 1985 while in New York, Swami Vivekananda had composed 13 songs under the title Song of the Sannyasin. Ma.Ko. rendered a splendid translation of these 13 songs. He also served as secretary of  Vivekananda Union, Madurai.

On 5, May 1901, he founded the Madurai Manavar Senthamizh Sangam to promote learning of Tamil among the students. He was only 23 then and he has said that Madurai, the great centre for Tamil, did not have a Tamil Sangam then and that he founded it to fill this void. This was founded even before the founding of Madurai Tamil Sangam by Pandithurai Thevar. Ma.Ko., a close friend of Pandithurai Thevar, also served as examiner and governing member in Madurai Tamil Sangam.

While carrying on these literary and academic activities, Ma.Ko. was also serving as lecturer in Tamil in the Madura College, then known as Native College of Madurai.

He also founded a library and named it Nachinarkinian Memorial Library (after the celebrated Tamil scholar). Subramania Bharati used to visit this library and there developed a friendship between Ma.Ko. and Bharathi. Ma.Ko. was one of the few pundits who recognized the greatness of Bharathi. In 1904, after Bharathi quit his job in Ettayapuram, he met Ma.Ko. who helped him to get a job in Sethupathy High School.

G.Subramania Iyer, the editor of Sudesamitran was another close friend of Ma.Ko. During one of his visits to Madurai, G.Subramania Iyer requested Ma.Ko. to suggest a young man to serve as sub editor. Ma.Ko. introduced and recommended Bharathi for that job. Subramania Iyer was delighted with Bharathi and asked him to come to Chennai to join Sudesamitran.

In 1907, Ma.Ko attended the Surat Congress session and wrote a detailed article in the Madurai-based journal Vivekabhanu on the pandemonium that followed the split in Congress. This article, entitled, Congress Mahasabai is considered the first published report in Tamil on the Surat session. Like Bharathi and VOC, Ma.Ko. supported Lokmanya Tilak and Aurobindo Ghosh.

After scanning 400 years of English poetry from Shakespeare to Tennyson, he chose over 40 pieces with aesthetic and moral values and rendered them in Tamil for the benefit of Tamil students. Among the experts who hailed him as a great translator were Rev.G.U.Pope and Bharathi.

In 1909, Ma.Ko. and Kandasami Kavirayar, a great Tamil poet, published a new journal Vidyabhanu. In 1915, he compiled all his published works including his Tamil poems, translations and essays and published them under the title, Arumporuttirattu. It was sponsored by the philanthropist Pethachi Chettiyar and published by Madurai Tamil Sangam. In 1916, under the auspices of his Madurai Manavar Senthamizh Sangam he started another journal by name Vivekodhayam. Many great Tamil scholars contributed articles to this journal. This journal was hailed by patriots like Subramania Siva and V.O. Chidambaram Pillai.

He used his vocation as teacher and journalist to instil value education in the young.  Two of his great concerns were to inspire feelings of patriotism and develop love of Tamil language among the student population.

Ma.Ko. married Dharmambal, (daughter of Annasami Iyer) and the couple had four daughters (Perunthiru, Annapurani, Savitri and Gomathi) and two sons (Sidhamoorthy and Krishnamoorthy).

Later Years and Death 
Ma.Ko. was invited to head the Dept. of Tamil at National College, Trichy in 1919 and he moved from Madurai to Trichy. At the request of his students at National college, Ma.Ko. started yet another journal, Nachinarkkiniyan. Ma.Ko. always considered teaching a labour of love and it is little wonder that his students bagged the gold medals by standing first in Madras Presidency. For the benefit of his students, he used to translate into Tamil the English poems that were prescribed as part of the syllabus and publish them in his journal. He also wrote editorials and poems celebrating patriots. After his mentor, Arasan Shanmukanar's demise, Ma.Ko. received the manuscript of his Valluvar Nerisai, wrote the commentary for it and published it in 1919.

Two of his works Filial Duty (புதல்வர் கடமை) and Visvanathan (விஸ்வநாதன்) were prescribed for TLSC Public Examination from 1921 to 1926. In 1927, when Meenakshi College was getting ready to become Annamalai University, he received an invitation to join the teaching fraternity of the University. He had accepted the invitation and was to join in June 1927, but he took ill and died in April 1927. When his health started failing, he realised that his days were numbered and as the editor of Nachinarkkiniyan, he was anxious that the subscribers who had paid the annual subscription in advance may lose their money if the journal ceased to come. So he made an announcement in March that in case of his demise the subscribers can take his books in lieu of the money already paid.

He was admired by his contemporaries for his unceasing and indefatigable efforts towards the development of Tamil. He was also admired for his impartiality, courage of conviction, gurubhakthi, simplicity and hard work. An elegy written on him by Lakshmi Narasimha Iyer features in Tamil Pulavar Agara Varisai:

எக்காலும் முயற்சியோடு மேதாவ 
தொன்றுரைத்தோ எழுதி யேயோ 
தொக்கார்கண் டுவந்திடநின் னுடல்பொருளா 
வியாம்மூன்றும் சோர்வில் லாமல் 
மிக்காரும் தமிழ்மொழிக்கே விழைந்துதவும் 
மேன்மையினை விதியி லாதேன் 
எக்காலம் கண்டிடுவேன் கோபால 
கிருட்டிணனே எங்கு சென்றாய்?

Ma.Ko’s Works 
A prolific writer, his articles were published in several journals from 1896, when he was hardly nineteen. Many of them were compiled under the title Arumporuttirattu and published by the Madurai Tamil Sangam in 1915. He continued to write till his demise in 1927 and some of his works were prescribed as textbooks in Chennai and Ceylon from 1921 to 1926. His works can be classified under the following 8 heads:

Thanipadalgal (தனிப்பாடல்கள்) 
This includes his poems of felicitations as well as elegiac poems written in honour of great public figures like Gurudev Rabindranath Tagore, U. Ve. Saminatha Iyer. Parithimal Kalaigner, Pandithuraithevar. This volume also includes Poems on social themes like Women's education. Biographical sketches of Greek philosophers like Socrates and Plato also feature in this volume.

Anthology of Translations (மொழிப்பெயர்ப்புக் கவிதைகள்) 
A pioneer in the field of translations, Ma.Ko. has scanned 400 years of English poetry, selected poems that have great aesthetic and ethical value and has translated them for the benefit of Tamil reading public in general and the student community in particular. His translations have been admired by scholars like GU Pope and Mahakavi Bharathi.

He had selected several passages from Shakespeare and rendered them in exquisite Tamil verse. For instance, he had translated The Seven Ages of Man from As You Like It. Describing the schoolboy, Shakespeare writes:

Then the whining schoolboy with his satchel
And the shining morning face, Creeping like a snail
Unwillingly to school.

Ma.Ko. translated it as:
தூண்டா நிற்ப, வேண்டா வெறுப்பொடு 
புத்தகப் பையொடு நத்தைபோல் ஊர்ந்து 
மினுங்கிய வதனம் சிணுங்கிச் சிணுங்கிக் 
காலைப் பொழுதிற் கல்விக் கழகம் 
மெள்ளச் செல்லும் பள்ளிப் பிள்ளை

Essays (கட்டுரைகள்)
He has written essays that have been collected under several themes like those on science, health, history, ethics, patriotism and education. Again, all of them have been written with a sense of commitment towards the younger generation and a deep concern for their betterment.

Filial Duty (புதல்வர் கடமை)
It describes the lives of 40 personalities drawn from oriental and occidental history and literature—personalities who have been exemplary in their execution of duty towards their parents. As pointed out by Dr. S.N. Kandasami, director, Centre for Higher Research – World Classical Languages, Tamil University, Tanjavur, this book will help younger generation cultivate higher values.

Poetic play entitled Visvanathan (விஸ்வநாதன்).
his play is also called Kadamai Muran. The story of Visvanatha Nayakkan who was caught between two conflicting duties is enacted in six acts. Highly poetic and dramatic the author has understood the pulse of this genre. This play has been staged during the anniversary celebrations of many Tamil sangams including the Madurai Tamil Sangam.

Mouna Desikar
A roaring comedy entitled Mouna Desikar in 8 acts. The characters are named in a way that reveals their qualities very much like those of the 16th century English dramatist Ben Jonson. The Pandya King, Tharpughzh Maran is piqued when the Chola messenger complains that there is no sign language expert in the Pandya kingdom. He bluffs that there is a great expert called Mouna Desikar. How the Pandya experts manage this bluff without losing face is the rest of the hilarious plot.

Vivekodayam
Vivekodayam was a literary Journal which he was editing and publishing from Madurai from 1916. Nachinarkiniyan was a literary journal he was editing and publishing from Trichy from 1919. Both journals carried Ma.Ko.’s editorials, contributions from academics in the field of Tamil, research articles in physics and chemistry, translations, poems and articles with patriotic fervor, biographical sketches on great personalities, policies by the government in connection with Tamil language, opinions of experts on these policies, to name a few.

Commentary on Valluvar Nerisai
Ma.Ko’s mentor Arasan Shanmuganar had written ‘Valluvar Nerisai’ where each kural was preceded by a two-line story from Indian epics and puranas to elucidate the message of that particular kural. After his mentor's passing, Ma.Ko. got the manuscripts from Shanmuganar's family and wrote commentary and explanation for each of them and published it serially in his Vivekodayam. Later, he compiled the first hundred kurals and published it as a volume in 1919 with foreword from V.Muthusami Iyer, personal assistant to the Inspector of Schools. In 1923, he continued the commentary on Valluvar Nerisai in Nachinarkkinian where he said that he would be compiling and bringing out the next hundred after the serial publication. However, he did not live to complete it.

Ma.Ko., thus was a prolific writer who excelled in every form of literature with a total commitment to nurturing the right values in the younger generation.

Ma.Ko. on Women’s Empowerment
Ma.Ko was a champion of women's empowerment and naturally advocated women's education. In 1916, when he started the journal Vivekodayam from Madurai, he announced a discount for women subscribers, and also made his cousin V. Balammal the assistant editor.

When there was a Govt. notification that all the states should submit their recommendations on women's education by 12 September 1916, Ma.ko ‘s journal Vivekodayam carried this news. He further suggested that the state governments should organize women's forums and seek the opinions of women members and send the final recommendations only after including what the women had to say.

He invited many women speakers like Pandithai Asalambikai Ammayar, Srimathi Krishnaveni, Srimathi Padmavathi to his Manavar Sangam to speak on various topics useful to students. He felicitated them in beautiful poetry and published them in the following issue of Vivekodayam. When there was a proposal to raise a memorial fund in the name of Sudesamitran Subramania Iyer, his journal suggested that 50% of the fund should be allocated for improving the status of women. Balammal recommended that there should be vocational centres for women to enable them to be economically independent.

In some of his essays, he celebrates the educated women of ancient India. In one of them, மதனலீலையார், he addresses all women as his sisters and tells them that timidity is no sign of virtue. He exhorts them to influence the family and educate themselves. His zeal for women's education is brought out in many of his works that feature in the 1915 collection (Arumporuttirattu). Special mention should be made of this delightful little poem, Pen kalvipperu (பெண் கல்விப்பேறு):

நாற்பொருளும் நாம்பெற்றேம்: நன்மக்கட் பேறுற்றேம்:
நாற்குணத்தேம் நாமகளின் நல்லருளால் – நாற்றிசையீர்!
மண்கல் விலங்காதி மானஇரேம்: பெற்றேமால் 
பெண்கல்வி என்னுமொரு பேறு.

Ma.Ko considered the girl child a hundred times more valuable than a boy child. He celebrated the birth of his first daughter in times when orthodox Hindu families looked forward to a male as the first-born.

He wrote an anti-dowry article in 1914, moved by the tragic episode of Snehalatha who ended her life unable to bear the travails her father had to go through. In that article, published by the Tamil journal Poorna Chandrodayam, he appeals to the young men to become aware of the evil consequences of dowry system and also spread this awareness.

Ma.Ko. and Tamil Development
Ma.ko's love for Tamil and the zeal to ensure its rightful place is seen in many of his poems, essays, translations and speeches. He founded the Madurai Manavar Senthamizh sangam in 1901 to encourage the learning of Tamil. Students from Madurai and other Tamil speaking areas were taught, tested and certified by this sangam. Many great scholars and philanthropists have participated in this forum including U.Ve.Saminatha Iyer, Pethachi Chettiyar, Ragunatha Rajaliar, V. Krishnasamy Iyer and Pandithurai Thevar.

Tamil as Medium of Instruction
Ma.Ko. also advocated Tamil as a medium of instruction and recalls a conversation with a Bengali scholar Pandavanatha Simham who told him that the percentage of postgraduates in Bengal is high because the students can learn Physics, Chemistry, Mathematics etc. without a knowledge of English. In a speech in a training school at Dindigul, Ma.Ko  says that the physics and chemistry an English boy learns at 8 is learnt imperfectly at 16 by an Indian student as he has to spend 10 years to learn English. He appeals to the scholars to translate the books in Tamil so that a poor Tamil student can learn the facts of science without wasting 10 years of his student life in learning English before he can learn science. That will also pave the way, said Ma.Ko., for the country's progress.

Ma.Ko. himself wrote a number of essays on science topics for Tamil students after reading articles on science from English journals and books. He also translated many English poems in a range of Tamil metres (சந்தம்). Mahakavi Bharathi admired him for that. The Golden Jubilee volume of National college, Trichy records:

"M. Gopala Krishna Iyer was the first head of the Tamil dept. An adept in translating into Tamil, poems from English without missing their original beauty, he improved the standards of education in Tamil language and literature even at the time when prominence was given only to English. We remember him today for elevating the status of Tamil even then."

In an essay on Tamil development, he lists the reasons for its low status and suggests the ways to elevate it and give it its rightful place. In his elegy on Parithimarkalaignar, he says that the Tamil Language will be given its status as a ‘Classical Language’ in future as envisioned by Parithimarkalaignar.

He has expressed contempt for the Tamilians who take pride in saying they do not know their mother tongue. He comments that such Tamils presume that the world will admire them for their knowledge of English in proportion to their ignorance of Tamil and they ought to be ashamed of it.

Though he condemned this infatuation for English, he did not condemn either the Englishman or the English language for it. He criticized vehemently the Tamils who failed to work for Tamil development though they had the right, the duty and the financial means to do so. He said there is no point in condemning the European who has no knowledge of Tamil, when our own kin whose mother tongue is Tamil do not realize its value.

His two journals Vivekodayam and Nachinarkkinian carried reports on all the activities of the various Tamil sangams including the programmes at Madurai Tamil Sangam. In these journals he also published essays on physics and chemistry in Tamil, translations of poems from other languages in Tamil, the proposals made by the government and universities in connection with the Tamil language, the opinions and comments on these changes proposed by them.

References 

19th-century Indian translators
Indian magazine editors
1878 births
1927 deaths
Dramatists and playwrights from Tamil Nadu
Tamil dramatists and playwrights
Indian male dramatists and playwrights
19th-century Indian dramatists and playwrights
20th-century Indian dramatists and playwrights
19th-century Indian male writers
20th-century Indian translators
Journalists from Tamil Nadu
20th-century Indian male writers
People from Tiruchirappalli district